In 4-dimensional geometry, the cubical bipyramid is the direct sum of a cube and a segment, {4,3} + { }. Each face of a central cube is attached with two square pyramids, creating 12 square pyramidal cells, 30 triangular faces, 28 edges, and 10 vertices. A cubical bipyramid can be seen as two cubic pyramids augmented together at their base.

It is the dual of a octahedral prism. 

Being convex and regular-faced, it is a CRF polytope.

Coordinates
It is a Hanner polytope with coordinates:
 [2] (0, 0, 0; ±1)
 [8] (±1, ±1, ±1; 0)

See also
 Tetrahedral bipyramid
 Dodecahedral bipyramid
 Icosahedral bipyramid

References

External links
 Cubic tegum

4-polytopes